Pitzer College is a private liberal arts college in Claremont, California. One of the Claremont Colleges, the college has a curricular emphasis on the social sciences, behavioral sciences, international programs, and media studies. Pitzer is known for its social justice culture and experimental pedagogical approach.

History
Pitzer was founded in 1963 as a women's college by Russell K. Pitzer (1878–1978), a California citrus magnate, philanthropist, and Pomona College alumnus. In April 1963, John W. Atherton, the dean of faculty and a professor of English at Claremont Men's College (now Claremont McKenna College) was hired as Pitzer's first president, and over the next seventeen months he recruited students, faculty, and trustees and constructed Scott and Sanborn Halls just in time for the fall 1964 semester. During the College's first year, students and faculty created the curriculum and the school's system of governance. The College graduated its first class of students in 1965 and became co-educational in the fall of 1970. The first academic term in the fall of 1964 began with eleven professors and 153 students from sixteen states and five countries. Pitzer's current president is the first African American to lead any of the five Claremont Colleges.

Presidents
John W. Atherton, founding president (1963–1970)
Robert H. Atwell, second president (1970–1978)
Frank L. Ellsworth, third president (1979–1991)
Marilyn Chapin Massey, fourth president (1992–2002)
Laura Skandera Trombley, fifth president (2002–2015)
Thomas Poon, interim president (2015–2016)
Melvin L. Oliver, sixth president (2016–2022)
Strom C. Thacker seventh president (term begins July 2023)

Campus

Access to campus is also provided via Interstate 10 and Interstate 210. The campus comprises sixteen buildings, including five residence halls. West and East Halls earned Platinum LEED certification when they opened 2012.

The Pitzer College campus occupies the northeast corner of the Claremont Colleges property, which contains seven institutions of higher education coordinated through the Claremont University Consortium. The Claremont Colleges comprise Pomona College (founded in 1887), Claremont Graduate University (1925), Scripps College (1926), Claremont McKenna College (1946), Harvey Mudd College (1955), Pitzer College (1963), and Keck Graduate Institute of Applied Life Sciences (1997). At present, the campus is split approximately in half by Pitzer Road. Harvey Mudd College is adjacent to Pitzer's north, Scripps to the west, and Claremont McKenna to the south.

Contemporary architecture characterizes the majority of Pitzer's buildings, several of which were designed by Gwathmey-Siegel following major donations from Eli Broad, a board member emeritus and former chair of the Pitzer College Board of Trustees. A notable exception is the Grove House, a California bungalow built in 1902 for a local citrus grower during the height of the Arts and Crafts movement. The building, a popular campus hangout, was purchased for $1.00 and moved to Pitzer in 1977 under the direction of Professor emeritus Barry Sanders. The Grove House is home to a cafe, the Women's Center, the Hinshaw Gallery and the EcoCenter.

Most landscaping on the campus follows principles of xeriscaping. Several varieties of citrus and other fruit are grown throughout campus and an organic community garden, dedicated grove and chicken coop are located north of Mead Hall. The 10-acre John R. Rodman Arboretum, founded in 1984 in an attempt to save surviving native chaparral vegetation from demolition, is part of the campus. It contains 16 themed gardens with drought-tolerant, native landscaping.

The campus also includes auditoriums, sports courts, and science buildings.

Located directly northwest of the main campus, the Robert J. Bernard Biological Field Station, a resource of The Claremont Colleges, is an  nature preserve consisting of coastal sage scrub.

The Outback Preserve, located in the northeast section of campus, occupies just over three acres of the John Rodman Arboretum. The Preserve is home to one of the rarest ecosystems in the world: Alluvial Sage Scrub. Undergoing ecological restoration as part of the Outback Restoration Project, the Preserve is a living-learning laboratory. The project seeks to restore the Outback Preserve to a more intact alluvial sage scrub ecosystem, removing invasive plants and ensuring the success of native species. Each semester there are a small number of courses utilizing the Outback Preserve. Courses are open to all students at The Claremont Colleges.

The Firestone Center for Restoration EcologyPitzer owns and operates a  field station on secondary growth rainforest, the Firestone Center for Restoration Ecology. The facility is located approximately two kilometers east of Playa Dominical, Costa Rica. The property borders the Hacienda Barú nature reserve. The Center is home to programs in Pitzer's science, language and international studies curricula.

Rankings

The U.S. News & World Report College and University rankings 2022-2023 edition ranks Pitzer College at the 33rd best national liberal arts college overall, and tied for 108th in "Top Performers on Social Mobility" out of 216 evaluated liberal arts colleges. In 2015, Pitzer was recognized nationally as the 8th most selective liberal arts college; 20th most selective among all college and universities; 44th in best freshmen retention rate; and 55th for highest proportion of classes with fewer than 20 students.

In Forbes 2019 college rankings, Pitzer was named 54th best among the 650 top-ranked colleges, universities and service academies in the U.S. In addition, Pitzer was named the 44th best private college, the 22nd best liberal arts college, and the 11th best college in the West.

Academics
As a member of The Claremont College Consortium, Pitzer students have access to nearly all facilities available to students enrolled at the other colleges, in addition to all facilities administered by the Claremont College Consortium. Any student attending Pitzer can enroll in classes at the other four colleges, and can complete an off-campus major if the major is not offered by Pitzer.

Pitzer offers 41 majors and 22 minors, many of them cross-disciplinary, and each student is assigned a faculty advisor upon their arrival on campus. The College expects students to take an active part in planning their course of study and has few distribution requirements. The most popular majors, based on 2021 graduates. were:
Research and Experimental Psychology (22)
Environmental Science (20)
Organizational Behavior Studies (18)
Political Science and Government, General (18)
Economics (17)

The student/faculty ratio is 10:1, and 100% of Pitzer's tenure-track faculty hold a Ph.D. or the terminal degree in their field.

The college operates 58 study abroad programs, including 41 international exchanges and 6 domestic exchanges. Pitzer College also operates its own study abroad programs in Brazil, Costa Rica, Ecuador, Italy, Nepal, Tanzania/South Africa/Zimbabwe, and Vietnam.

Pitzer has ranked as a top producer of Fulbright US Student Program awardees for 13 consecutive years thus far and is one of the nine baccalaureate institutes who have been top producers of Fulbright US students every year for at least the past decade. From 2010 to 2015, The Chronicle of Higher Education listed Pitzer first in Fulbright Fellowships among all undergraduate institutions nationwide. In 11 of the 12 years from 2003 until 2015, Pitzer alumni received more Fulbright Fellowships per capita than alumni from any other college or university in the nation. In 2015, Pitzer students and alums were awarded 21 Fulbright awards.

Admission

Pitzer College does not require the SAT or ACT for students applying for admission. For the Class of 2026, Pitzer College accepted 17% of applicants (enrolling fall 2022) with an average high school GPA of 4.05. Of the 32% of enrolled freshmen submitting SAT scores, the middle 50% range was 1370–1460 for the composite score, 668–730 for evidence-based reading and writing, and 680–750 for math, while of the 28% of enrolled freshmen submitting ACT results, the middle 50% range for the composite score was 30–33.

Student body
Pitzer College enrolls approximately 1000 students, making it the third largest of the five undergraduate Claremont Colleges (Claremont McKenna and Pomona have larger student bodies, while Harvey Mudd and Scripps are smaller). Pitzer College ranks 25th nationwide among all Baccalaureate Colleges for percentage of its students who study abroad, and Pitzer has the highest rate of study abroad among the Claremont Colleges. Students of color constitute over 49.6% of the total student body and Pitzer enrolls 10% international students, the third largest among the Claremont Consortium behind Pomona College (12%) and Claremont Mckenna College (16%).

Community involvement
The Pitzer College community is known for its involvement outside of the classroom. Its students, faculty, and staff donate over 100,000 hours to community service annually. The College has been named to the President's Higher Education Community Service Honor Roll seven times.

Much of Pitzer's community engagement occurs in the Community Engagement Center (CEC). The CEC runs the Pitzer in Ontario Program, a comprehensive semester-long service learning and cultural immersion program with a strong theoretical foundation in the human sciences informed by the best practices in the field of experiential education. The program integrates extensive internship experiences in city, private or non-profit organizations with interdisciplinary coursework that provides the theoretical framework from which social and urban issues can be effectively evaluated. Through living in Ontario, students have the opportunity to engage firsthand the diversity of voices, perspectives, and agendas that are driving those demands, and to come to a better understanding of the many layers of engaged citizenship.

At the Campus Compact 20/20 Visioning Summit on October 17, 2006, the Corporation for National and Community Service recognized Pitzer as one of 28 California campuses distinguished for community service and Hurricane Katrina relief efforts. Pitzer College received Mother Jones Magazine 2006 Campus Activism for Thinking Outside of the Box.

Pitzer College students including former Speaker of the California State Assembly Fabian Nunez '97 helped in founding the Pomona Economic Opportunity Center. Through the Community Engagement Center, dozens of Pitzer students volunteer each semester with programs at Camp Afflerbaugh and California Youth Authority Chino.

Events and traditionsKohoutek Music and Arts Festival began in 1974 and is a student-run multi-day outdoor music and arts festival held each spring on the Pitzer campus. The event, which is free and open to all Claremont Colleges community members, is named after Comet Kohoutek, discovered by Czech astronomer Lubos Kohoutek. Past groups that have headlined Kohoutek include: O.A.R, Blackalicious, The Roots, Tea Leaf Green, Breakestra, Zolar X, Lyrics Born, Akron/Family, Zion I, and Toubab Krewe. Last year's headliners were Matt & Kim, Blu, and Mr. Lif and featured a performance by special guests Mandrill. The festival generally includes a number of non-music components including off-campus and student vendors, fire performances, a farmers market, and other activities.Groove at the Grove: refers to those concerts or other performances held on Thursday nights at the Grove House, but the term may be used at other times as well. The event represents Pitzer's most consistent contribution to the weeknight arts and music scene at the Claremont Colleges. Acts set up on the front steps of the Grove House with the audience standing immediately in front of the structure. Numerous student and professional groups have performed at the event, including We Are Scientists.Hammocks on The Mounds: refers to the hanging of hammocks on the Pitzer Mounds, the uneven grassy area located directly north of McConnell Center. The hammocks are generally donated by students and/or alumni, or purchased by the student government.Orientation Adventure or OA is the College's pre-Welcome Week program for incoming First-Year, Transfer, and New Resource students. The program offers multi-day thematic trips throughout California, led by student leaders. Over the program's history themes have included backpacking, sustainability, coastal biking, grassroots movements, surfing, and Los Angeles arts & music. Trips generally vary in length from three to four days and destinations of past trips have included: Sequoia National Park, Kings Canyon National Park, Chávez National Center, San Gabriel River Trail, Newport Beach, Los Angeles, San Onofre, community gardens, and San Diego.Murals provide unique visual atmosphere to Pitzer college. Murals are painted by students, staff, and guests artists on the interiors and exteriors of campus buildings. Diverse themes include portraits, politics, literature, and purely whimsical imagery.Snackie Snack occurs weekly, and is a free late-night snack served by the Pitzer Activities (PAct) Programming Board. During exam periods, Snackie Snack is served by the president and members of the cabinet."Reggae Fest" began in 2003 as a fall concert event. Sometimes referred to as "BobFest", the event occurs during the first weekend in November and features Reggae, Dancehall, Afrobeat, and World music. The festival runs over the course of a single day and features 5-9 live, professional bands, free food and beverages. The event has been hosted by California reggae personality Junor Francis each year since its inception. In 2016, the Pitzer College Student Senate suspended funding for the event amid concerns that it was culturally appropriative and disrespectful toward Jamaican culture.

Student life

Residence halls

The majority of Pitzer students live on campus in one of five residence halls: Atherton Hall, East Hall, West Hall, Mead Hall, Pitzer Hall and Sanborn Hall. Each hall is equipped with laundry rooms, common rooms for meetings or social gatherings, study rooms, full kitchens and has a full-time in-residence hall director. All Pitzer residence halls, balconies included, are non-smoking.

Through the Faculty in Residence Program, each year two members of the Pitzer faculty live in one of the two faculty apartments in the residence halls on campus, and design and run events for students. The assistant dean of students also lives on campus.

First- and second-year students are not permitted to bring cars to campus, although exceptions can be made on a case-by-case basis.Atherton Hallis a four-story building adjacent to the Gold Student Center. Atherton accommodates 62 students. Rooms are double occupancy with two rooms sharing an adjoining vanity, bathroom, and shower. Common areas include a living room, six study rooms, and laundry facilities. The basement level of Atherton Hall is home to the mailroom, a music practice room, the Lenzner Family Gallery, art studio with classroom, and the Writing Center.Pitzer Hallis a four-story building southeast of the Gold Student Center that houses 78 students. Rooms are double occupancy, with two rooms sharing an adjoining vanity, bathroom and shower. Common areas include a living room, eight study rooms, and laundry facilities. The first floor houses the Office of Admission. One of the two Faculty in Residence apartments is also in Pitzer Hall.Sanborn Hallis a two-part three story building east of the Gold Student Center. Sanborn houses 178 students. Rooms are double occupancy with two rooms sharing an adjoining vanity, bathroom and shower. Common areas include a living room, nine study rooms, laundry facilities, and a kitchen. One of the two Faculty in Residence apartments is also in Sanborn.West and East Halls are made up of four buildings that house 300 sophomores, juniors and seniors in suite-style living. Opened in fall 2012, West and East Halls are the newest residential living areas on Pitzer's campus. Living in W.E. Halls is set on the northwest part of campus. W.E. Hall has 67 suites that have two double-occupancy rooms with a shared bathroom. There are also ten suites that have four single rooms with a shared bathroom and common room. Only junior and seniors are eligible to live in single rooms.Mead Hall''' is a three-story, six-tower complex which houses 225 students. Each suite shares a common living room with four or eight residents in each unit. Common areas include a community kitchen, laundry facilities and a television lounge. Mead is home to Career Services, Center for Asian Pacific American Students, The Rabbit Hole (substance abuse education and outreach program), the Marquis Library, and the Writing Center. This hall offers a Substance Free Tower and a Community Involvement Tower that exemplifies one of the college's educational objectives: awareness of the social and ethical implications of action. Residence life in the Involvement Tower is generally self-governed within the parameters of Pitzer's residential life policies, subject to amendment by Pitzer College Student Senate. Students are required to attend Tower meetings and participate in Pitzer's community or the community at large.

Club and intramural sports
Pitzer students also participate in the Claremont Colleges club sports programs that compete nationally.

Gold Student Health and Wellness Center
Originally opened in 1995, the Gold Student Health and Wellness Center was completely renovated and reopened in 2014. It is a hub of campus life activity for the entire Pitzer community. The Center is home to the College's gym, a yoga studio, a Pilates studio, and the student-run Shakedown Café. There is also incorporated club meeting space, multipurpose programming space, and the offices of some Student Affairs staff.

Residential Life Project
The Residential Life Project is expected to be completed in three phases over the next 10 to 15 years. Phase I, which included Sanborn, Pitzer, and Atherton Halls, was completed and inaugurated in September 2007 and received LEED Gold recognition from the United States Green Building Council in 2008. Robert Redford and Ed Begley, Jr. were the keynote speakers at the dedication ceremony of the Residential Life Project. The College broke ground on Phase II, which incorporates four new residence halls, a demonstration kitchen, an archive, a board room and program/faculty offices, in December 2010. It was completed in 2012 and earned LEED platinum certification.

When Pitzer's Residential Life Project is complete, the College expects to become the first college in the nation to have all Gold or Platinum LEED certified residence halls.

Student clubs and organizations
Pitzer has more than 50 student clubs and organizations on campus, in addition to over 200 others within the Claremont Colleges consortium.

The Green Bike Program (GBP), a student run bicycle collective, maintains a full service shop, as well as fleet of recovered and reused bicycles that are raffled off free of charge each semester for student use. The GBP works to provide an alternative mode of transportation to combat the predominant and destructive car culture in Southern California, as well as to reduce consumption and consumerism while increasing the practical use of recycled and reused materials. The GBP maintains a strong DIY ethic, and has become a social hub for both student and community activism.The Student Life, the primary student newspaper of the Claremont Colleges, covers Pitzer.

Athletics

Athletics history
Pitzer College began competing with Pomona College in 1970, when it was seven years old. The interim arrangement became permanent two years later.

Cost and financial aid
For the 2015-16 academic year, tuition is $48,400, a double room is $8,770, the 16-per-week meal plan is $6,440. About thirty-seven percent of Pitzer students receive financial assistance in loans, work study, scholarships, and/or institutional grants. Pitzer utilizes the Federal FAFSA and the CSS Profile to determine financial need, and Pitzer has stated a commitment to meeting 100% of every student's demonstrated financial need. The average financial aid package at Pitzer is $40,250. Since 2004, the College has significantly reduced the average amount of indebtedness of its students to $19,422, well below the national average of more than $35,000.

Notable alumni
Anne Archer 1969, actress
Matthew Berkowitz, filmmaker
David Bloom 1985, anchor, NBC News
Max Brooks 1994, author and lecturer, son of Mel Brooks and Anne Bancroft
Dennis Cooper, novelist, poet, critic, and performance artist
John Darnielle 1995, novelist and lead singer of The Mountain Goats
Eric Douglas American actor and stand-up comedian, son of Kirk Douglas, brother of Michael Douglas
Mablean Ephriam '71, former prosecutor for the city of Los Angeles, television personality and actress
Kevin de León 2003, president of the California State Senate
Eli Erlick 2016, transgender activist, director of Trans Student Educational Resources
Susan Feniger 1976, celebrity chef and restaurateur
Tom Freund 1993, singer-songwriter and musician
Amy Gerstler 1978, poet and winner of the 1991 National Books Critics Circle Award for Bitter AngelJenniphr Goodman 1984, writer/director of The Tao of SteveSteven González 1985, Chief Justice of the Washington State Supreme Court
Matthew Karatz 1994, deputy mayor of Los Angeles
John Landgraf 1984, FX Network president
J.Lately (Jeremy Namkung) 2009, rapper
Dana Levin 1987, poet
Hunter Lovins, co-founder of Rocky Mountain Institute
Setha Low 1969, anthropologist, director of The Public Space Research Group
Jonah Matranga 1991, singer-songwriter and musician, former frontman for Far and Gratitude.
Sandra Mitchell 1973, award-winning author, professor and philosopher of science
Sharon Monsky 1975, founder of the Scleroderma Research Foundation
Dee Mosbacher, documentary filmmaker, gay rights activist, and psychiatrist
Debbie Mucarsel-Powell, member of the U.S. House of Representatives from Florida's 26th congressional district
Matt Nathanson 1995, singer-songwriter and musician
Ashwin Navin 1998, CEO of Sambaa. 
Fabian Núñez, former Speaker of the California State Assembly
Susan Patron 1969, children's author and winner of the 2007 Newbery Medal for The Higher Power of LuckyNick Simmons 2011, reality television personality, son of Gene Simmons and Shannon Tweed
Sophie Simmons reality television personality, daughter of Gene Simmons and Shannon Tweed
Michael Simpson 1986, Grammy Award-winning producer/composer; one half of the Dust Brothers
Rob Magnuson Smith 1991, author
Debra Wong Yang 1981, former United States Attorney for Central District of California; first Asian-American woman U.S. attorney
Sarah Penna 2006, Entrepreneur/Co-Founder; Big Frame & Frolic

Notable faculty
Halford Fairchild, Psychology and Black Studies
Judith Grabiner, Mathematics, history of mathematics and science. Awarded the 2014 Beckenback Book Prize for her book A Historian Looks Back: The Calculus as Algebra and Selected Writings (MAA Spectrum, 2010); Inaugural member of the 2012 Fellows of the American Mathematical Society
David Moore, Psychology, Director of the Claremont Infant Study Center and winner of the American Psychological Association's 2016 Maccoby Book Award for The Developing Genome: An Introduction to Behavioral Epigenetics (2015)
Gregg Popovich, men's basketball coach 1979–1986, 1987–1988
Dana Ward, Emeritus Professor of Political Studies – Founder of the Anarchy Archives, Executive Director of the International Society of Political Psychology (1998–2004).
Phil Zuckerman, Sociology and Secular Studies; expert in secularity, atheism, apostasy, and Scandinavian culture. Author of several books including Living the Secular Life'' (2014). Frequent contributor to the Huffington Post and sought after commentator for discussions on secularism by multiple media outlets.

See also
Pomona-Pitzer College Athletics

References

External links

Website of The Student Life, the 5C newspaper
Official athletics website

 
1963 establishments in California
Claremont Colleges
Claremont, California
Educational institutions established in 1963
Liberal arts colleges in California
San Gabriel Valley
Schools accredited by the Western Association of Schools and Colleges
Universities and colleges in Los Angeles County, California
Private universities and colleges in California